Johannes Võerahansu (28 January 1902, Keo – 17 October 1980 Tallinn) was an Estonian painter.

1932-1936 he studied at Ado Vabbe atelier in Pallas Art School. In 1940s he taught at Tartu State Art Institute. 1955-1957 he taught at Tartu Art School, and 1957–1973 at Estonian State Art Institute.

Since 1945 he was a member of Estonian Artists' Association. He was also a member of EKKKÜ (abbreviation of ).

References

1902 births
1980 deaths
Estonian painters
20th-century Estonian painters
20th-century Estonian male artists
Academic staff of the Estonian Academy of Arts
People from Rapla Parish
Burials at Metsakalmistu